Anku Pande (born Vishakhapatnam, 13 November 1972) is a film producer from Nainital, Uttarakhand in India.

Pande has been responsible for introducing new talent and franchises into the industry as creative head of Viacom18 Motion Pictures.

She has worked across all media and entertainment platforms. She started her career as an editor and then went on to direct and produce various documentaries and television commercials.

She is an alumna of The American Film Institute, Los Angeles.

Biography

She started her career under Dileep Patgaongar and Vinod Dua as an assistant producer and reporter. From there she moved on to work for Fremantle India. She then joined Bitv as an editor and was one of the first few to be trained to use the Grass Valley Switcher and edit using Avid. After Bitv she worked freelance as director and editor for corporate films, edited shows for TV, directed and produced commercials and documentaries. 
She then moved to Los Angeles to do her master's degree in film producing at the American Film Institute. 
Her film work started as executive producer with Ram Gopal Varma Productions, after which she went on to production work with national and international film studios, 
setting up local productions for Warner Brothers India.
 
Pande was the Chief Creative Officer for Balaji Entertainment's 'Alt Entertainment'. She then moved to Viacom18 Motion Pictures as their Creative and Development Head. She also started 'Tipping Point' to focus on new talent and smaller budget movies for Viacom18 Movies.
She sourced Raagini MMS for Alt Entertainment, and approved Gangs of Wasseypur, Shaintaan, Tanu Weds Manu and Pyaar Ka Punchnama amongst others for Viacom18 Motion Pictures.

Pande since then has been developing and producing films along with her husband Ramon Chibb in their company Manomay Motion Pictures Pvt Ltd.

Filmography

Viacom 18 Motion Pictures

References

External links
 

1972 births
Living people
Indian women film producers
Film producers from Andhra Pradesh
AFI Conservatory alumni
Businesspeople from Visakhapatnam
Indian women television producers
Indian television producers
20th-century Indian businesswomen
Businesswomen from Andhra Pradesh
21st-century Indian businesswomen
21st-century Indian businesspeople
20th-century Indian businesspeople
Women television producers